The Essential Paul Simon is a compilation album of Paul Simon's songs from the years 1971-2006 and released in 2007. An edition exists with a DVD featuring performances from The Dick Cavett Show and Saturday Night Live. It was re-released in 2010 in Australia through Sony BMG a part of The Essential series.

Reception 

Stephen Thomas Erlewine from Allmusic calls the compilation "efficient, picking up after the parting of ways with Garfunkel and running straight through until 2006's Surprise." He believes "some might argue that there's too heavy of a Graceland presence here — a whopping six tracks, over half the album — but it is his biggest album and functions as a nice transition between his better-known '70s hits and the more esoteric but frequently compelling work that he's done since."

Track listing
All tracks are written by Paul Simon except as noted.

Disc 1
 "Mother and Child Reunion" - 3:04
 "Loves Me Like a Rock" - 3:32
 "Me and Julio Down by the Schoolyard" - 2:44
 "Duncan" (Early fade-out) - 4:29
 "Kodachrome" - 3:33
 "50 Ways to Leave Your Lover" - 3:28
 "Slip Slidin' Away" - 4:45
 "Gone at Last" - 3:38
 "Something So Right" - 4:32
 "Late in the Evening" - 4:02
 "Hearts and Bones" - 5:39
 "Take Me to the Mardi Gras" - 3:26
 "That Was Your Mother" - 2:54
 "American Tune" - 3:45
 "Peace Like a River" - 3:18
 "Stranded in a Limousine" - 3:07
 "Train in the Distance" (Edited version) - 4:22
 "The Late Great Johnny Ace" - 4:47
 "Still Crazy After All These Years" - 3:25

Disc 2
 "Graceland" - 4:46
 "Diamonds on the Soles of Her Shoes" (Simon, Joseph Shabalala) - 5:38
 "The Boy in the Bubble" (Simon, Forere Motloheloa) - 3:58
 "You Can Call Me Al" - 4:36
 "Under African Skies" - 3:35
 "The Obvious Child" - 4:08
 "Born at the Right Time" - 3:48
 "The Cool, Cool River" - 4:31
 "Spirit Voices" (Simon, Milton Nascimento) - 3:54
 "Adios Hermanos" (Simon, Derek Walcott) - 4:43
 "Born in Puerto Rico" (Simon, Walcott) - 4:55
 "Quality" (Simon, Walcott) - 4:12
 "Darling Lorraine" - 6:36
 "Hurricane Eye" - 4:13
 "Father and Daughter" - 4:10
 "Outrageous" (Simon, Brian Eno) - 3:22
 "Wartime Prayers" - 4:48

DVD bonus
Videos
 "Me and Julio Down by the School Yard" - Directed by Gary Weis, 1988 (video includes 25 second rap intro) - 3:12
 "You Can Call Me Al" - Directed by Gary Weis, 1986 - 4:40
 "The Boy in the Bubble" - Directed by Jim Blashfield, 1986 - 4:03
 "Diamonds on the Soles of Her Shoes" - Directed by Ethan Russell, 1987 - 5:50
 "The Obvious Child" - Directed by Ruy Guerra, 1990 - 4:33
 "Father and Daughter" (from The Wild Thornberrys movie, 2002) - Directed by Wayne Isham, 2002 - 4:08
TV Appearances
 "Mrs. Robinson" (Excerpt from The Dick Cavett Show, April 4, 1970) - 4:14 
 "Loves Me Like a Rock" (Excerpt from Saturday Night Live, October 18, 1975) - 3:20 
 "Sweeney Sisters" (Excerpt from Saturday Night Live, December 19, 1987) - 6:15 
 "Homeward Bound" (with George Harrison) (Excerpt from Saturday Night Live, November 20, 1976) - 3:33

Charts

Certifications

Release history

References

Paul Simon compilation albums
2007 compilation albums
2007 video albums
Music video compilation albums
Albums produced by Paul Simon
Albums produced by Phil Ramone
Albums produced by Roy Halee
Sony Music compilation albums
Warner Records compilation albums
Legacy Recordings compilation albums